Steins Peak is a  mountain in Hidalgo County, New Mexico. It lies south of the upper reach of Doubtful Canyon.

History
The peak was named for U. S. Army Major Enoch Steen (1800–1880) who led troops and an expedition in the area in 1849 and the early 1850s.   It was a landmark for travelers that indicated the Doubtful Canyon pass through the Peloncillo Mountains along the Butterfield Overland Mail where it built its Steins Peak Station to the north of the mountain along Doubtful Canyon.

References

External links
  Photos of Steins Peak Station ruins and Steins Peak

Mountains of New Mexico
Landforms of Hidalgo County, New Mexico
Mountains of Hidalgo County, New Mexico